Football Club Ararat-Armenia is an Armenian professional football club based in Yerevan. The club was formed in 2017 as FC Avan Academy before changing their name to FC Ararat-Moskva at the beginning of 2018, and then FC Ararat-Armenia upon gaining promotion to the Armenian Premier League in the summer of 2018.This article encompasses the major records set by the club and their players in the Armenian Premier League, Armenian Cup and European competitions. The player records section includes details of the club's goalscorers and those who have made more than 50 appearances in first-team competitions.

Players

Most appearances 

Players played over 50 competitive, professional matches only. Appearances as substitute (goals in parentheses) included in total.

Goal scorers 

Competitive, professional matches only, appearances including substitutes appear in brackets.

Clean Sheets 

Competitive, professional matches only, appearances including substitutes appear in brackets.

Internationals

Current players

Away on loan

Former players

Team

Record wins
Record win: 11–2
v Sevan, 2019–20 Armenian Cup, 27 November 2019.
Record League win: 8–0 
v Erebuni, 2017–18 Armenian First League, 12 March 2018.
Record Armenian Cup win: 11–2
v Sevan, 2019–20 Armenian Cup, 27 November 2019.
Record home win: 8–0 
v Erebuni, 2017–18 Armenian First League, 12 March 2018.
Record away win: 11–2
v Sevan, 2019–20 Armenian Cup, 27 November 2019.

Record defeats
Record defeat: 0–4
v Gandzasar Kapan, 2017–18 Armenian Cup Quarter-Final 2nd leg, 11 October 2017.
Record League defeat: 1–5
v Lori, 2017–18 Armenian First League, 3 September 2017.
Record Armenian Cup defeat: 0–4
v Gandzasar Kapan, 2017–18 Armenian Cup Quarter-Final 2nd leg, 11 October 2017.
Record European defeat: 1–3
v AIK, 2019–20 UEFA Champions League First qualifying round 2nd leg, 17 July 2019.
Record home defeat: 0–4
v Gandzasar Kapan, 2017–18 Armenian Cup Quarter-Final 2nd leg, 11 October 2017.
Record away defeat: 0–3
v Gandzasar Kapan, 2017–18 Armenian Cup Quarter-Final 1st leg, 13 September 2017.

Wins/draws/losses in a season
 Most wins in a league season: 18 – 2018–19
 Most draws in a league season: 7 – 2018–19, 2019–20
 Most defeats in a league season: 9 – 2017-18
 Fewest wins in a league season: 14 – 2017-18
 Fewest draws in a league season: 4 – 2017-18
 Fewest defeats in a league season: 6 – 2019–20

Goals
 Most League goals scored in a season: 85 – 2019-20
 Most League goals scored in a season: 65 – 2017–18
 Fewest League goals scored in a season: 45 – 2019-20
 Most League goals conceded in a season: 41 – 2017–18
 Fewest League goals conceded in a season: 23 – 2019-20

Points
 Most points in a season:
61 in 32 matches, 2018–19 Armenian Premier League
 Fewest points in a season:
46 in 27 matches, 2017–18 Armenian First League

References

FC Ararat-Armenia